Amarnath Amarasingam is a Canadian extremism researcher.

Career
Amarasingam studied religion and culture at Wilfrid Laurier University from 2007 to 2011. Since September 2011 he teaches as a lecturer at Wilfrid Laurier University, since January 2012 additionally at the University of Waterloo. 2013 he was awarded a PhD with a thesis on social movement activism, his doctoral advisor was Lorne L. Dawson. From May 2014 to May 2016, he conducted research with a grant from the Social Sciences and Humanities Research Council as a postdoctoral fellow at Dalhousie University. He is a senior research fellow at the London Institute for Strategic Dialogue, a fellow in the George Washington University Center for Cyber and Homeland Security extremism program and since January 2017 directs a study on Western Foreign Fighters at the University of Waterloo.

Amarasingam has written for The New York Times, Politico, The Atlantic, VICE News, The Daily Beast, Foreign Affairs, The Huffington Post, Al Jazeera und "War on the Rocks". 2016 he participated in the TV-documentation "ISIS: Rise of Terror".

Books 
 Pain, Pride, and Politics: Social Movement Activism and the Sri Lankan Tamil Diaspora in Canada. (Thesis) University of Georgia Press 2015 
 Sri Lanka: The Struggle for Peace in the Aftermath of War. C. Hurst & Co. 2017 
 The Stewart/Colbert Effect: Essays on the Real Impacts of Fake News. McFarland & Company 2011 
 Religion and the New Atheism: A Critical Appraisal. Brill Publishers 2010 ; Haymarket Books 2012

References

External links 
 Profile of Amarnath Amarasingam at Canadian Network for Research on Terrorism, Security and Society (TSAS)
 

Academics and writers on far-right extremism
Living people
Place of birth missing (living people)
Academic staff of the University of Waterloo
Wilfrid Laurier University alumni
Academic staff of Wilfrid Laurier University
Year of birth missing (living people)